Percutaneous aortic valve replacement (PAVR), also known as percutaneous aortic valve implantation (PAVI), transcatheter aortic valve implantation (TAVI) or transcatheter aortic valve replacement (TAVR), is the replacement of the aortic valve of the heart through the blood vessels (as opposed to valve replacement by open heart surgery, surgical aortic valve replacement, SAVR). The replacement valve is delivered via one of several access methods: transfemoral (in the upper leg), transapical (through the wall of the heart), subclavian (beneath the collar bone), direct aortic (through a minimally invasive surgical incision into the aorta), and transcaval (from a temporary hole in the aorta near the navel through a vein in the upper leg), among others.

Severe symptomatic aortic stenosis carries a poor prognosis. At present there is no treatment via medication, making the timing of aortic valve replacement the most important decision to make for these patients. Until recently, surgical aortic valve replacement was the standard treatment for adults with severe symptomatic aortic stenosis. However, the risks associated with surgical aortic valve replacement are increased in elderly patients and those with concomitant severe systolic heart failure or coronary artery disease, as well as in people with comorbidities such as cerebrovascular and peripheral arterial disease, chronic kidney disease, and chronic respiratory dysfunction.

Overview
Patients with symptomatic severe aortic stenosis have a mortality rate of approximately 50% at 2 years without intervention. In patients who are deemed too high risk for open heart surgery, TAVR significantly reduces the rates of death and cardiac symptoms. Until about 2017 TAVR was not routinely recommended for low-risk patients in favor of surgical aortic valve replacement, however it is increasingly being offered to intermediate risk patients, based on studies finding that it is not inferior to surgical aortic valve replacement.

Transapical TAVR is reserved for patients for whom other approaches are not feasible: an evidence-based BMJ Rapid Recommendation made a strong recommendation against transapical TAVR in people who are also candidates for either transfemoral TAVR or surgery. People who have the option of either transfemoral TAVR or surgical replacement are likely to choose surgery if they are younger than 75 and transfemoral TAVR if they are older than 75. The rationale for age-based recommendations is that surgical aortic valve replacements are known to be durable long-term (average of durability of 20 years), so people with longer life expectancy would be at higher risk if TAVR durability is worse than surgery.

Devices

Medtronic's CoreValve Transcatheter Aortic Valve is constructed of a self-expanding Nitinol frame and delivered through the femoral artery. This device received FDA approval in January 2014.

Boston Scientific's Lotus Valve system was awarded CE approval in October 2013. It allows the final position to be assessed and evaluated before release and has been designed to minimise regurgitation.

St Jude Medical's Portico Transcatheter aortic valve received European CE mark approval in December 2013. The valve is repositionable before release to ensure accurate placement helping to improve patient outcomes.

Edwards' Sapien aortic valve is made from bovine pericardial tissue and is implanted via a catheter-based delivery system. It is approved by the FDA for use in the US.

Implantation 

The devices are implanted without open heart surgery. The valve delivery system is inserted in the body, the valve is positioned and then implanted inside the diseased aortic valve, and then the delivery system is removed. The catheter based delivery system can be inserted into the body from one of several sites.

The transfemoral approach requires the catheter and valve to be inserted via the femoral artery. Similar to coronary artery stenting procedures, this is accessed via a small incision in the groin, through which the delivery system is slowly fed along the artery to the correct position at the aortic valve. A larger incision in the groin may be required in some circumstances.

The transapical approach sees the catheter and valve inserted through the tip of the heart and into the left ventricle. Under general anesthesia, a small surgical incision is made between the ribs, followed by a small puncture of the heart. The delivery system is then fed slowly to the correct position at the aortic valve. The puncture in the heart is then sutured shut.

The transaortic approach sees the catheter and valve inserted through the top of the right chest. Under general anesthesia, a small surgical incision is made alongside the right upper breastbone, followed by a small puncture of the aorta. The delivery system is then fed slowly to the correct position at the aortic valve. The hole in the aorta is then sutured shut.

The transcaval approach has been applied to a smaller number of patients who are not eligible for transfemoral, transapical, or transaortic approaches. In the transcaval approach a tube is inserted via the femoral vein instead of the femoral artery, and a small wire is used to cross from the inferior vena cava into the adjacent abdominal aorta. Once the wire is across, a large tube is used to place the transcatheter heart valve through the femoral vein and inferior vena cava into the aorta and from there the heart. This otherwise resembles the transfemoral approach. Afterwards, the hole in the aorta is closed with a self-collapsing nitinol device designed to close holes in the heart.

In the subclavian approach, an incision is made under the collarbone under general anesthesia, and the delivery system is advanced into the correct position in the aortic valve. The delivery system is then removed and the incision is sutured closed.

After-care
Regular medical checkups and imaging tests are required after TAVI.

The Mayo Clinic says that blood thinners (anticoagulants) are prescribed to prevent blood clots after TAVI. Artificial heart valves are susceptible to bacterial infection; most bacteria that cause heart valve infections come from the mouth, so that good dental hygiene and routine dental cleaning are recommended. Antibiotics are prescribed for use before certain dental procedures.

New or worse post-procedure symptoms that require attention include dizziness or light-headedness, swelling of the ankles, sudden weight gain, extreme fatigue with activity, and signs of infection. Emergency attention is required for chest pain, pressure or tightness, severe, sudden shortness of breath, or fainting.

Complications 
When PAVR surgery is performed an important and difficult aspect that affects the patient is the orientation, uniformity and depth at which the valve is inserted. When the valve is not inserted correctly, when there is incomplete sealing between the native heart valve and the stented valve, paravalvular leak (PVL) can occur.  Key properties associated with paravalvular leak are the regurgitation volume, the PVL orifice location (anterior or posterior) and the associated fluid dynamic effects that occur from the interactions between the regurgitated flow and the normal transmitral flow.

Morisawa et al. carried out quantitative research to determine how the PVL flow effected normal transmitral flow based on three different in-vitro situations: no PVL, anterior orifice PVL and posterior orifice PVL. The results showed that while the two PVL cases worsened the fluid dynamics of the normal transmitral flow seen without leakage, the posterior orifice PVL was worse, leading to a higher circulation and kinetic energy, requiring the heart to work harder and consume more energy to maintain normal bodily functions.

Prognosis

Recovery
A 2018 study that interviewed nineteen elderly patients six months after a transapical TAVI procedure found that participants felt weak and tired at first after TAVI, some more than before the procedure. Some reported a later "surprisingly simple rehabilitation" with rapid recovery, while others had a "demanding rehabilitation", with slow recovery, fatigue, and weakness.

Durability
The durability of transcatheter prostheses, in terms of all-cause mortality and the need of re-intervention, was not reliably known  due to the lack of long-term follow-up data. A narrative review published in 2021 reported that a 2015 study involving simulation on first-generation prostheses suggested a TAVI durability limited to 7-8 years. Later prostheses have improved durability. 

Bioprosthetic valve disfunction (BVD) has historically been divided into SVD (structural valve deterioration, including irreversible intrinsic changes of the prosthetic valve structure), NSVD (non-structural valve deterioration, including irreversible intra- or para-prosthetic regurgitation, prosthesis malposition, and patient-prosthesis mismatch), valve thrombosis, and endocarditis (which can be potentially reversible). Durability seems to be similar between TAVI and surgical implantation (SAVR), but there is a lack of long-term data, with only computed simulation models available. In many respects TAVI and SAVR are comparable, but TAVI still has a higher rate of NSVD. In elderly patients the prostheses should outlive the patient. The 2021 review suggested that in younger patients (with longer average life expectancy) choosing TAVI might still be premature, due to the increased likelihood of the need for future re-operation with worse prognostic impact.

History
The catheter procedure was invented and developed in Aarhus University Hospital Denmark in 1989 by Henning Rud Andersen, who performed the first animal implantations that year. The first implantation in a human was performed on 16 April 2002 by Alain Cribier in Hopital Charles Nicolle, at the University of Rouen, France. Technology experts Stan Rowe and Stan Rabinowitz partnered with physicians Alain Cribier and Martin Leon of NewYork–Presbyterian Hospital and others to create the company Percutaneous Valve Technologies (PVT) in 2002. The company was purchased by Edwards Lifesciences in 2004; its valve became the Sapien valve. It was the first aortic valve device to receive FDA approval, in November 2011 for use in inoperable patients and in October 2012 for use in patients at high surgical risk. The device is effective in improving functioning in patients with severe aortic stenosis. It is now approved in more than 50 countries.

Internationally famous pop singer Mick Jagger had the procedure in March 2019 at NewYork–Presbyterian, which was said to have raised public awareness.

References

Further reading 
 
 

Cardiac procedures